John Hanmer may refer to:

John Hanmer (MP died 1604), MP for Flint Boroughs (UK Parliament constituency)
John Hanmer, 1st Baron Hanmer (1809–1881), British politician
John Hanmer (bishop) (1574–1629), Welsh bishop of St. Asaph
Sir John Hanmer, 3rd Baronet
Sir John Hanmer, 1st Baronet